His Sister's Kids is a 1913 American short comedy film featuring Fatty Arbuckle.

Cast
 Roscoe 'Fatty' Arbuckle
 Jack White
 Minta Durfee (uncredited)

See also
 List of American films of 1913
 Fatty Arbuckle filmography

References

External links

1913 films
1913 comedy films
1913 short films
American silent short films
American black-and-white films
Films directed by George Nichols
Silent American comedy films
American comedy short films
1910s American films